"What Child Is This?" is a Christmas carol with lyrics written by William Chatterton Dix in 1865 and set to the tune of "Greensleeves", a traditional English folk song, in 1871. Although written in Great Britain, the carol today is more popular in the United States than its country of origin.

Lyrics

Composition
The first verse poses a rhetorical question in the first half, with the response coming in the second half.  The second verse contains another question that is answered, while the final verse is a universal appeal to everyone urging them "to accept Christ".  The carol's melody has been described as "soulful", "haunting and beautiful" in nature.

Context
The context of the carol centres around the Adoration of the Shepherds who visit during the Nativity of Jesus.  The questions posed in the lyrics reflect what the shepherds were possibly pondering to themselves when they encountered Jesus, with the rest of the carol providing a response to their questions.

Background and influence
At the time he was writing the lyrics to "What Child Is This?" in 1865, William Chatterton Dix was working as the manager of an insurance company.  He was afflicted by an unexpected and severe illness that resulted in him being bedridden and suffering from severe depression.  His near-death experience brought about a spiritual renewal in him while he was recovering.  During this time, he read the Bible comprehensively and was inspired to author hymns like "Alleluia! Sing to Jesus!" and "As with Gladness Men of Old".  The precise time in 1865 when he wrote the poem "The Manger Throne" is disputed.  While the St. Petersburg Times details how Dix penned the work after reading the Gospel for Epiphany that year (Matthew 2:1–12) recounting the journey of the Biblical Magi; Singer's Library of Song: Medium Voice contends that it was actually authored during the Christmas of 1865.

History
Although written in 1865, "What Child Is This?" was only first published six years later in 1871, when it featured in Christmas Carols Old and New, a "prestigious" and "influential" collection of carols that was published in the United Kingdom.  The hymnal was edited by Henry Ramsden Bramley and John Stainer; even though it is not known with certainty who paired the three stanzas from "The Manger Throne" with the music from "Greensleeves", the third edition of The Christmas Encyclopedia by William D. Crump and Stories of the Great Christmas Carols both suggest that Stainer – who was also responsible for "harmoniz[ing] the musical setting" – may have done so.

See also
 List of Christmas carols

References

External links
What Child is This on Hymnary.org with all representative texts
Free sheet music of What Child Is This? for SATB from Cantorion.org
What Child Is This?  on TradTune.com
What Child is This? by Thomas Hewitt Jones at OUP
What Child Is This? by Sojourn Music
What Child is This? by Jessie Galante & Giuseppe Galante

Christmas carols
Burl Ives songs
Glen Campbell songs
Sissel Kyrkjebø songs
1871 songs
Songs written by William Chatterton Dix
Songs about Jesus
Epiphany music
Songs based on poems